Elizabeth Spayd is an American media journalist. She was the first woman to be named managing editor at The Washington Post, the editor and publisher of the Columbia Journalism Review, the sixth public editor of The New York Times, and a transparency consultant for Facebook. During her tenure at The New York Times, she took a number of controversial stances, and the paper eliminated her role in 2017.

References

External links

Living people
Colorado State University alumni
The New York Times public editors
Year of birth missing (living people)
American magazine editors
The Washington Post people
Facebook people